The combined event was held on February 13 at Snowbasin. It consisted of 3 runs, a downhill and two runs in the slalom.  American Bode Miller skied from 15th place after the downhill to a silver medal, 0.28 second behind Kjetil André Aamodt, who won a record sixth Olympic medal in alpine skiing.

Results
The results of the men's combined event in Alpine skiing at the 2002 Winter Olympics.

References

External links
Official Olympic Report
results

Combined